This is a list of Algerian football transfers in the 2017 summer transfer window by club. Clubs in the 2017–18 Algerian Ligue Professionnelle 1 are included.

Ligue Professionnelle 1

CR Belouizdad

In:

Out:

CS Constantine

In:

Out:

DRB Tadjenanet

In:

Out:

ES Sétif

In:

Out:

JS Kabylie

In:

Out:

JS Saoura

In:

Out:

MC Alger

In:

Out:

MC Oran

In:

Out:

NA Hussein Dey

In:

Out:

Olympique de Médéa

In:

Out:

USM Alger

In:

Out:

USM Bel-Abbès

In:

Out:

USM El Harrach

In:

Out:

US Biskra

In:

Out:

Paradou AC

In:

Out:

USM Blida

In:

Out:

Ligue Professionnelle 2

MC El Eulma

In:

Out:

Ligue Nationale du Football Amateur

RC Arbaâ

In:

Out:

References

Algeria
Lists of Algerian football transfers
2017–18 in Algerian football